Spennymoor Grammar School (also known as Alderman Wraith Grammar School) was a selective state school in County Durham:

History
It opened in 1922, went through several name changes and finally closed in 2015.

Notable former pupils

 Sir Percy Cradock, British diplomat, civil servant and sinologist, Ambassador to China from 1978 to 1983
 Eric Gates, striker for Ipswich Town
 John McManners, British clergyman and historian of religion
 Bruce Oldfield, fashion designer (briefly)
 Dave Parnaby, football manager
 Jack Scott, BBC weather forecaster
 John Walton, Baron Walton of Detchant (formerly Sir John Walton), neuroscientist
 Peter Willis, former association football referee
 James Woodward, Principal of Sarum College

References

Defunct grammar schools in England
Defunct schools in County Durham
Educational institutions disestablished in 1940
Educational institutions established in 1922
Spennymoor
1922 establishments in England